St. Stephen's Church is ruined church in Blinisht, Lezhë County, Albania. It is a Cultural Monument of Albania.

References

Cultural Monuments of Albania
Buildings and structures in Lezhë
Churches in Albania